Kayarlyk (Kayırlık) is a rural locality (a selo) in Ongudaysky District, the Altai Republic, Russia. The population was 195 as of 2016. There are 5 streets.

Geography 
Kayarlyk is located km 63 west of Onguday (the district's administrative centre) by road. Yelo is the nearest rural locality.

References 

Rural localities in Ongudaysky District